María Zayas-Bazán Hernández (born 14 October 1958), known as Ada Zayas-Bazán, is a children's author, poet and teacher from Cuba. She was born in the town of Florida in Camagüey Province, Cuba. She writes in the Spanish language and is known for her works Pupa, Palabras Mágicas, and Dulce Hogar.

References

1958 births
Living people
People from Florida, Cuba
20th-century Cuban women writers
20th-century Cuban poets
Cuban women poets
Cuban children's writers
Cuban women children's writers
Cuban dramatists and playwrights